The Alberta Act, effective September 1, 1905, was the act of the Parliament of Canada that created the province of Alberta. The Act is similar in nature to the Saskatchewan Act, which established the province of Saskatchewan at the same time. Like the Saskatchewan Act, the Alberta Act was controversial because (sec. 21) it allowed the Government of Canada to maintain control of all of Alberta's natural resources and public lands. Alberta did not win control of these resources until the passage of the Natural Resources Acts in 1930.

The Alberta Act defined the boundaries for the electoral districts of the first Alberta general election in 1905.

The Alberta Act is part of the Constitution of Canada.

See also

 Saskatchewan Act

References

External links

 English text of The Alberta Act
 Photo reproduction of The Alberta Act, English
 Photo reproduction of Acte de l’Alberta, French

1905 in Canadian law
Alberta law
Canadian federal legislation
Constitution of Canada
Government of Alberta
Politics of Alberta
September 1905 events